The IBG Prague Open, previously known as the RPM Open, is a professional tennis tournament played on clay courts. It is part of the Association of Tennis Professionals (ATP) Challenger Tour. It is held in Prague, Czech Republic.

Past finals

Singles

Doubles

References

ATP Challenger Tour
Clay court tennis tournaments
Tennis tournaments in the Czech Republic
Sports competitions in Prague